Bike paths in Sydney, New South Wales, Australia, vary widely, with the majority either shared cycle and pedestrian paths or on road paths, and a small number of separated cycleways.  In 2009 the Sydney Morning Herald reported that "Sydney's cycleways are not so much an organised network as a fragmented collection of winding paths and half-finished ideas. Most were built or designed when cycling was viewed as a pleasant pastime rather than a practical form of travel and are now poorly suited to commuting."

In 2013 4,400 cyclists rode to or from Sydney central business district on an average day, via the Sydney Harbour Bridge (2,000), Anzac Bridge (1,400) and Anzac Parade (1,000) cycleways.

In July 2020, in response to the COVID-19 pandemic, two pop up cycleways were complete in the City of Sydney. These are part of Transport for NSW's CovidSafe Travel Plan with about 20 km of cycleways being designated in Randwick, Parramatta and Sydney CBD.

See this section for web-based maps.

Sydney Cycleways network 
The Sydney City Council is progressively building an increasing network of  separated cycleways, shared paths and other infrastructure in and adjacent to the central business district.

, the council listed the following popular rides:
 Sydney Foreshore Loop a  loop circuit linking   and Circular Quay
 Markets Circuit a  ride linking , Glebe, and 
 Quirky Sydney Ride a  ride linking  and 
 Sporting Sights Ride a loop circuit from Sydney Football Stadium, and 
 Parks and Gardens Circuit #1 a  ride linking the Royal Botanic Gardens with Victoria Park via Martin Place, Surry Hills, Darling Harbour, Pyrmont and Wentworth Park
 Parks and Gardens Circuit #2 linking Prince Alfred Park with Victoria Park
 Inner-East Art Ride an  ride including , Surry Hills, The Domain and Mrs Macquarie's Chair
 Three Creeks Ride a  loop circuit from Glebe,  and Orphan School Creek
 Bay Run and Hawthorne Canal Ride an  loop circuit including Robson Park, Hawthorne Canal Reserve, Leichhardt Park, King George Park, and Brett Park
 Two Ducks Family Ride a  ride from Sydney Park to Moore Park via Alexandria Park

Bike paths along freeways and tollways 
A number of freeways and tollways have been constructed with dedicated separate bicycle paths built alongside.

Gore Hill and Epping Road cycleways 

The cycleways are generally aligned with the Gore Hill Freeway and Epping Road respectively. In the twelve months to February 2014, between 400 and 500 cyclists used the cycleway at Merrenburn Avenue on an average weekday.

M2 cycleway 

The M2 cycleway is a predominately on road  cycleway generally aligned with the M2 motorway in the Hills District of Sydney. As the M2 does not have a separate cycle lane or path, the cycleway comprises the breakdown lane of the roadway.

Cycling access was removed in 2010 during construction work to upgrade the M2. During that time, cyclists were required to use an alternate route on suburban streets that was  longer, steeper and slower. The design of the alternative route was criticised due to safety concerns. In August 2013 access was restored westbound from Delhi Road to Windsor Road.  Citybound access was restored only for the section from Windsor Road to Pennant Hills Road due to work to stabilise the embankment near the eastbound lanes at Marsfield. There is an alternate route citybound.

As a result of the construction of the NorthConnex cycleway access to the M2 both east and westbound between Pennant Hills Road and Windsor Road was removed with effect from February 2012 adding a further  via a detour route, with work expected to be completed by late 2018.

The M2 cycleway connects to the M7 cycleway at Seven Hills at its north-western terminus and to the Gore Hill and Epping Road cycleways at North Ryde at its eastern terminus.

M4 cycleway

The M4 cycleway is a  shared use path for cyclists and pedestrians that is generally aligned with the M4 Motorway.

In the twelve months to February 2014, between 30 and 40 cyclists used the M4 cycleway at  West on an average weekday.

M5 cycleway 

The M5 cycleway is a  predominately on road   cycleway generally aligned with the M5 motorway in south-western Sydney. The eastern terminus of the cycleway is in  where it connects with the Cooks River cycleway. The southwestern terminus of the cycleway is in  where is connects with the M7 cycleway. The cycleway does not have a separate cycle lane or path, instead cyclists use the breakdown lane. , due road to works near the King Georges Road interchange, the breakdown lane is closed and cyclists must exit and ride through back streets.

M7 cycleway 

The M7 cycleway is a  shared use path for cyclists and pedestrians that is generally aligned with the Westlink M7 in Greater Western Sydney. There are over 60 entry/exit points and has its own bridges.

Bike paths across major bridges 
Sydney is divided geographically by Port Jackson, Middle Harbour and the Parramatta River, Botany Bay and the Georges River and Broken Bay and the Hawkesbury River and Nepean River. These natural barriers mean that travelling by bike around Sydney requires use of the many bridges. The accessibility of bike paths across bridges is variable as set out in this section.

Sydney Harbour Bridge cycleway 

The northern terminus of the cycleway is at Burton Street, just below Milsons Point railway station.

Pyrmont Bridge 
The Pyrmont Bridge is a shared cycle and pedestrian zone. At the eastern terminus leading to the central business district, Pyrmont Bridge is linked by the Western Distributor to the King Street separated cycleway and to the Sussex Street cycle path. There is no bike path from Market Street and walking a bike along the footpath requires ascending a flight of stairs. At the western terminus in Pyrmont, the Pyrmont Bridge is linked to Anzac Bridge by the Union Street separated cycleway and an on road cycle route, with low to medium traffic on Miller Street and Saunders Street. In 2015 around 1,600 cyclists rode on the Union Street cycleway on an average weekday.

Anzac Bridge 
The Anzac Bridge has a shared cycle and pedestrian path on its northern side. Between 1,300 and 2,000 cyclists used the Anzac Bridge on an average weekday in the 12 months to February 2014.

At the eastern (Pyrmont) end there is a spiral ramp that begins at the corner of Saunders Street and Quarry Master Drive. To the east Anzac Bridge is linked to Pyrmont Bridge by an on road cycle route (low to medium traffic) on Saunders Street and Miller Street and the Union Street separated cycleway.

At the western (Rozelle) end Anzac Bridge is linked to the Iron Cove Bridge by Victoria Road; to Rozelle and Blackwattle Bays via the Beatrice Bush Bridge; and to Lilyfield Road via a footbridge over Victoria Road. The footbridge is narrow and includes a tight corner at each end, 180° on the eastern end and 90° on the western end. An alternative to the footbridge is to use Beatrice Bush Bridge and cross the Crescent at the traffic lights.

Iron Cove Bridge 
The Iron Cove Bridge consists of two bridges. The 1955 bridge has a narrow shared pedestrian and cycle path on the eastern side of the bridge. Between 200 and 300 cyclists used the 1955 bridge on an average weekday in the 12 months to February 2014.

The 2011 duplicate bridge has a 4.3 metres (14.3 feet) wide shared pedestrian and cycle path on the western side of the bridge. Between 350 and 600 cyclists used the 2011 duplicate bridge on an average weekday in the 8 months to October 2013.

At the southern (Balmain) end the Iron Cove Bridge is linked to the Anzac Bridge by Victoria Road; and to King George Park and the Bay Run by a cycle path on the western side and by an underpass from the eastern side via Terry Street and Warayama Place. Alternatively, cross Victoria Road at Terry Street or Wellington Street.

At the northern (Drummoyne) end the Iron Cove Bridge is linked to the Gladesville Bridge by Renwick Street, Wrights Road, Drummoyne Avenue and Cambridge Road from the eastern side; to Henley Marine Drive and the Bay Run by a ramp on the western side; and to Victoria Road and Day Street by a ramp on the western side.

Gladesville Bridge 
The Gladesville Bridge has a narrow shared cycle and pedestrian path on its eastern side. Do not attempt to cycle on the western side as the path is too narrow for a bike.

On the southern (Drummoyne) end the connection can be confusing as cyclists are prohibited from using 50m of the path alongside Victoria Road between Wolsley Street and Cambridge Road. The designated route from the Iron Cover Bridge is via Renwick Street, Wrights Road, Drummoyne Avenue and Cambridge Road.  The Canada Bay Bike Plan 2005 proposed to widen the path between Cambridge Road and Wolseley Street and stated that this was one of five routes "formally included by RTA in BikePlan 2010 and have RTA funding and priorities allocated". This did not happen and was dropped by the Council in 2014.

The northern (Gladesville) end was identified in the NSW Bike Plan 2010 as one of 13 "major missing links" and that the "Huntleys Point pedestrian / cycle bridge" was a "priority metropolitan link".   there is no indication when, if at all, work will commence on this bridge.

To ride from Drummoyne to Hunters Hill, as you exit the Gladesville Bridge, the designated cycle route is via a 180° corner at the end of the bridge, down alongside the access loop (from Burns Bay Road at Hunters Hill to Victoria Road at Gladesville). You will drop below the road level where there are four stairs on your left. Go down the stairs and through the tunnel before descending a further two flights of stairs to Huntleys Point Road. Ride north along Huntley's Point Road for about 100 metres where there is a path to the left. Take the path up the hill past the southern end of Keeyuga Road, keep to the left hand path which will take you onto Tarban Creek Bridge.

The designated cycle route when travelling east along Victoria Road from Gladesville to Drummoyne is to join the footpath next to Victoria Road at Mortimer Lewis Drive. The path drops down away from Victoria Road and goes under Burns Bay Road, coming out at the northern end of Keeyuga Road. 50 metres up Keeyuga Road, cross the road where there is a path to the right. Follow the path to the T junction and turn left which will take you past the southern end of Keeyuga Road. The path stops at the bottom of the hill on Huntley's Point Road. Continue along the grass for 100 metres and turn right up the two flights of stairs, through the tunnel and up a further four stairs. Turn right up the hill where there is a 180° corner that will take you up and over the bridge.

The designated cycle route when travelling from Drummoyne to Gladesville the designated cycle route is via a 180° corner at the end of the bridge, down alongside the access loop (from Burns Bay Road at Hunters Hill to Victoria Road at Gladesville). You will drop below the road level where there are four stairs on your left. Go down the stairs and through the tunnel before descending a further two flights of stairs to Huntleys Point Road. Follow Huntleys Point Road to the south.  At the top of the hill, before the road turns left, the path is on the right which crosses back to Victoria Road.

Some cyclists cross onto the access loop as an alternative to descending the stairs however there is limited visibility, especially given the speed of the traffic on the access loop.

Ryde Bridge 
The Ryde Bridge consists of two bridges. The eastern concrete bridge (carrying southbound traffic) has a shared cycle and pedestrian path on the eastern side.

Access to the southern (Rhodes) end is via Llewellyn Street. Access to the Meadowbank Railway Bridge is via an underpass, Leeds Street and Blaxland Road.

Access to the northern (Ryde) end is via the Loop Road. There are bike paths heading in both directions along the Parramatta River.

Old Meadowbank Rail Bridge 

The 1895 iron lattice Meadowbank Railway Bridge was replaced as the railway bridge for the Main Northern railway line by the John Whitton Bridge in 1980. In 2000 the old bridge was converted to a shared cycle and pedestrian path. Between 300 and 425 cyclists used the Old Meadowbank Rail Bridge on an average weekday in the 12 months to February 2014, with a greater number on the weekend.

Access at the southern (Rhodes) end is via Blaxland Road.

Access to the northern (Ryde) end is via Bay Drive or Bank Street. There are bike paths heading in both directions along the Parramatta River.

Silverwater Bridge 
Silverwater Bridge has a narrow shared cycle and pedestrian path on either side of the bridge. On the southern (Silverwater) side access is via Clyde Street. On the northern (Ermington) side, access is via a ramp leading from the Parramatta River.

Captain Cook Bridge 
The Captain Cook Bridge has a narrow shared cycle and pedestrian path in both directions. Between 125 and 225 cyclists used the Captain Cook Bridge on an average weekday in the 12 months to February 2014, with a greater number on the weekend.

Como Rail Bridge 
Between 150 and 300 cyclists used the Old Como railway bridge on an average weekday in the 12 months to February 2014. A popular extension for cyclists is to head to Oatley Park on the western side of Oatley.

Alfords Point Bridge 
The Alfords Point Bridge has a shared path on the eastern side from Clancy Street, Padstow Heights to Fowler Road, Illawong.

Spit Bridge 
Whilst more than 400 cyclists commute over the Spit Bridge every day, cyclists are not well catered for, with a choice of negotiating the narrow shared path on the western side or riding on the heavily congested road.

The western path, whilst designated as a shared path, is less than 1.2 metres wide at two points. The bridge itself is only four lanes and heavily congested. The only benefit of the congestion is that traffic is moving slowly whilst crossing the bridge. If you are heading south from Spit Bridge, to avoid cycling up Spit Road, after the bridge take the first left into Parriwi Road and cycle up the hill. Parriwi Road reconnects with Spit Road at the top of the hill.

Woronora River Bridge
The Woronora River Bridge has a shared path located just underneath the road. The path can be accessed from Menai Road on the Bangor side and Prince Edward Park Road or River Road on the Sutherland side.

Bike paths

Cooks River cycleway 

The Cooks River cycleway is a  shared use path for cyclists and pedestrians that is generally aligned with the Cooks River in Sydney.

The Cooks River cycleway connects to the Parramatta Valley cycleway at Ryde to Sydney Olympic Park and Bicentennial Park at Rhodes, and with the Brighton Le Sands cycleway, which runs south as far as Cronulla. Much of the length is shared cycleway and footpath, though there is some on-road near Homebush.

Parramatta Valley cycleway 

The Parramatta Valley cycleway is a  shared used path for cyclists and pedestrians that is generally aligned with the course of the Parramatta River. The eastern terminus of the cycleway is at Morrisan Bay Park in Ryde and heads west along dedicated bike paths, quiet streets and the river foreshore to its western terminus in the Parramatta Park. There is a short on-road section along Lancaster Road Melrose Park, an elevated steel mesh boardwalks through Ermington Nature Reserve.  There is a further short on-road section via Pike Street and South Street Rydalmere to Vineyard Creek. There is an elevated steel mesh boardwalk through Baludarri Wetlands. Cyclists have to cross Macarthur Street Parramatta then use the Gasworks Bridge to continue along the south side of the Parramatta River, before crossing back to the north side at the Parramatta ferry wharf. The decision to put a tunnel through Lennox Bridge was controversial  however the tunnel opened in 2015 and links the cycleway with Parramatta Park. There are connections to Rhodes and Olympic Park via Ryde Bridge or Meadowbank Railway Bridge; to Windsor Road cycleway via Parramatta Park and Westmead; and then connecting to the M7 cycleway and to the M4 cycleway via Harris Street and Good Street, Harris Park.

In the 12 months to February 2014, between 175 and 300 cyclists used the Parramatta Valley cycleway at Rydalmere on an average weekday, with a greater number on the weekend.

Sydney Olympic Park and Bicentennial Park 

Liverpool to Parramatta T-way cycleways 
Shared paths run along the Liverpool-Parramatta T-way from Hoxton Park Road, Liverpool to Davis Road at Wetherill Park, connecting via Horsley Drive and Wetherill Park Reserve. The path rejoins the T-Way at Victoria Street to Davis Road, Wetherill Park. There are connections to Prospect Creek cyclepath, Orphan School Creek cyclepath, Clear Paddock Creek cyclepath. Further towards Parramatta the path runs alongside Cumberland Highway to South Wentworthville then under the M4 and beside Jones Park to emerge beside Pitt Street to the heart of the Parramatta CBD and Parramatta Park.

Much of the route is impaired by the numerous traffic light crossings, with one 4 km section from Stockland Mall to Davis Road through Wetherill Park having eight sets of traffic lights. By combining with the Lower Prospect Canal, the T-Way cycleway provides continuous off-road path from Hoxton Park to Parramatta.

Parramatta to Liverpool Rail Trail Cycleway 
There is a  cycle path running mostly along the route of the rail line between Parramatta railway station and Liverpool railway station. Being mostly adjacent to the railway line there are very few road crossings or traffic lights. At the northern end the path passes under the railway line near Granville on a very narrow 1.5 m wide path and then follows back streets before becoming a proper off-road path near Merrylands. At Fairfield the trail passes through some commuter car parks (which are quiet on weekends) and traverses a short section of road. Near Canley Vale there is a complicated section that crosses two railway bridges and two roads in the space of 100 metres (or less). Overall, across its 25 km length the path is of a fairly high standard, but on weekday evenings the path tends to become overwhelmed with pedestrians. A 6.5 km extension to this trail is to head south from Liverpool Station to the cycleway on Speed St where you soon will join the shared path to the Casula railway station. Cross the railway line at the station and head further south to Glenfield station on the shared path. The path follows the Georges River and passes the Casula Powerhouse.

Prospect Canal Reserve Cycleway 
A 7.6 km path, part of the Lower Prospect Canal Reserve, from Prospect Reservoir in west to Pipehead at Guildford in the east. Entry and exit points are: Frank Street at Guildford, Albert Street cnr Tennyson Pde at Guildford, Sherwood Road at Merrylands, Cumberland Hwy at Merrylands, Cumberland Road at Greystanes, Macquarie Road/Taylor Street at Greystanes, Gipps Road at Greystanes, Bayfield Road at Greystanes, Hyland Road at Greystanes, Reconciliation Road at Wetherill Park and Prospect Reservoir. This wonderful ride has no road crossings at all for 6.5 km due to the original canal bridge crossings being retained and used by the cycleway. It is therefore an excellent area for families to ride. There are cycle path connections at the western end to Pemulwuy and Wetherill park, at the eastern end to the Parramatta-Liverpool Rail Trail and at the Cumberland Hwy to the Parramatta-Liverpool T-Way path. A water bubbler has been provided near the Taylor Street access path (2 km west of the Cumberland Highway).

The path was closed at Prospect in 2010 due to works carried out by Boral, resulting in community outcry. The path was restored to working order in September 2010 and is currently usable at the western end to the Prospect Dam area boundary with an at grade traffic light crossing of Reconciliation Road. The path was closed at Prospect Dam from September 2013 to March 2015  due to maintenance work on the dam wall and a major underground electricity cable was laid through the reserve alongside the path and many of the entry/exit paths were then replaced. Community groups continue to fight for a bridge over Reconciliation Road with some funding provided by the previous Labour State government but funding remains uncompleted .
At time of this edit, March 2020, no major works on track and it is a wonderful public facility.

Prospect Creek Cyclepath 
Running mostly alongside Prospect Creek, this 8 km cycleway connects Fairfield to the Prospect Reservoir, joining onto the Parramatta to Liverpool rail trail and the Lower Prospect Canal Reserve cycleway at each end. The path mostly travels through parkland, passing Prospect Nature Reserve and Rosford Street Reserve, among other parks, and is almost entirely off-road, except for a short on-road section along Douglas Street and Ace Avenue. Despite its length, only three roads are crossed, Fairfield Road, Cumberland Highway, and Gipps Road, with grade separated underpasses for each road.

The Gipps Road in Smithfield underpass can fill with water during heavy rain, however an at grade crossing nearby can be used. Two parallel paths exist on the north and south sides of Prospect Creek through Fairfield Road Park, the former sitting within Cumberland Council and the latter within Fairfield City Council. The path on the south (Fairfield) side provides the best through route to the Rail Trail and Fairfield. At points along the path local councils have created aboriginal information sites that are well worth stopping at.

Orphan School Creek Cyclepath 
There is a 10 km shared path along Orphan School Creek from Canley Vale railway station to Abbotsbury. It connects to the Parramatta to Liverpool Rail Trail Cycleway at Canley Vale railway station, to the Clear Paddock Creek shared path at King Road, Fairfield West, to the Liverpool to Parramatta T-way at Myrtle Road, and to the Prospect Dam to Abbotsbury cyclepath at Abbotsbury. An attraction of this path is the complete lack of traffic lights although the multiple at grade road crossings in Greenfield Park can be difficult to cross with children. The major crossing of Smithfield Road is at grade and quite dangerous.

An excellent loop ride is possible by combining the Orphan School Creek path with the Parramatta-Liverpool Rail Trail, the Lower Prospect Canal and Prospect Dam to Abbotsbury paths. The loop can be shortened by using the Parramatta-Liverpool T-Way path instead, though this path has at least eight traffic light crossings through Wetherill Park.

Prospect Dam to Abbotsbury Cyclepath 
An 8 km fully paved section of off-road cycleway runs from the dam wall picnic ground to the Calmsley Hill City Farm at Abbotsbury. The one major road crossing of Horsely Drive has traffic lights, another smaller road is crossed at grade. Connection alongside Horsely Drive to the M7 path is also an off-road path. Excellent access to Western Sydney Regional Park and a large number of mountain bike trails of all standards. There is a rest area (called The Dairy) with toilets and drinkable water. There is no development along the route and therefore no nearby vehicle traffic or pedestrians. The section between Horsely Drive and The Dairy is particularly enjoyable with small undulations and smooth bends. There is a steep descent and climb near the City Farm. A short detour can be made up a very steep hill to "Moonrise" for excellent views of the Sydney Basin.

Windsor Road cycleway 

The Windsor Road cycleway is a predominately off-road  cyclepath between Parramatta Park and Macquarie Street,  that is generally aligned with the Windsor Road and Old Windsor Road. The cycleway accesses the North-West T-way between Darcy Road, Westmead to Windsor. Some major road crossings are required, particularly on Old Windsor Road but all are controlled by traffic lights. Between the  stretch from Westmead to Rouse Hill there are some 26 traffic light controlled road crossings and therefore riding along this cycleway is a very stop-start process. There is a steep climb from Abbott Road up to Seven Hills Road when travelling north.

The Bay Run 

The Bay Run is a  shared path (with some sections of separated cycle path) that encircles Iron Cove in the Inner West. Many cyclist commuters use parts of the Bay Run, either to access Lilyfield Road or the Iron Cove Bridge. The Bay Run is also popular with walker and runners. As a result, some pedestrians spill onto the separated cycle path, especially in the most popular times such as summer evenings. The path is entirely off road. Access to and from the Bay Run between Formosa Street, Drummoyne and Brent Street, Russell Lea is poor, with the only access point being Henley Street, Drummoyne, which is obstructed by a power pole. The location and markings of the sections of separated cycle path is confusing as in some places the bike path is painted red, e.g. between Waterfront Drive and Leichhardt Rowing Club and in other the footpath is painted red, e.g. between Rodd Point to Barnstaple Road. Similarly in some places the bike path is on the Bay side of the footpath, e.g. between Leichhardt Rowing Club and Maliyawul Street, while in other places it is on the inland side of the footpath, e.g. along Henley Marine Drive from Duke Avenue to Thompson Street. , works are in progress to widen the bike path and segregate it from the pedestrian path in either direction from the bridge that was constructed across the Iron Cove Creek Canal (near the intersection of Timbrell Drive and the City West Link) earlier in the year.

At the mouth of Hawthorne Canal, near the junction of Hawthorne Parade, Lilyfield Road, Maliyawul Street, and Dobroyd Parade, there is the option to add an additional  to the loop circuit by heading south until crossing the footbridge on Barton Street and returning north up the other side of the canal.

Bay to Mountains Cycleway 
This major infrastructure project was proposed as part of the 2000 Olympic Games works to link Sydney Olympic Park with the Dunc Gray Velodrome at Bankstown and the mountain bike and Sydney International Equestrian Centre at Abbotsbury. A rough figure-8 route was designed joining Olympic Park with Bass Hill, Abbotsbury, Prospect and Guildford. Works over the years have seen a large portion of the western loop of the route constructed from Bankstown Veledrome to Abbotsbury, Prospect Dam and Guildford. The part of this loop from the velodrome north to Sefton is yet to be constructed but there is a short section beside Duck River from South Granville almost to Regents Park and also a short section through Birrong. There has been little work on the eastern loop from Sefton to Auburn however a path near the M4 is completed between North Auburn and Olympic Park however a large loop around Olympic Park exists joining North Strathfield to Newington.

Bass Hill to Canley Vale 
A 6 km off-road cyclepath through Mirrembeena Regional Park. Excellent riverside paths through the regional park with an overpass over Henry Lawson Drive. Joins to the Parramatta-Liverpool Rail Trail and Orphan School Creek paths. The double traffic light crossing of Hume Hwy is safe but tedious.

Toongabbie Creek/Windsor Road Cycleway 
A 6 km off road cyclepath through Baulkham Hills that connects Old Windsor Road with Windsor Road. Mostly following the Toongabbie Creek. The path is narrow in places though well defined, and has a couple of short steep sections going under some roads. While there are a couple of quiet street crossings there are no major roads to cross. There are other joining paths through Sophia Doyle Res creating alternative routes.

Sutherland to Cronulla Active Transport Link 

A partially constructed link between Sutherland and Cronulla. Currently, the only constructed portion is between Sutherland and Kirrawee It consists in some places of shared paths, and in other locations dedicated separated cycleways and footpaths. There are combined zebra and cycleway crossings along the route on speed tables, however in other locations there is no marked crossing.

Bush trails 
Anderson's Fire Trail
Lady Carington Drive
Leura - Mt Hay
Manly Dam Reserve
Mt York - Lawson's Long Alley
Mt York - Berghofer's Pass
Narrow Neck
Newnes Junction to Newnes Town
Woodford - Glenbrook Fire Trail

See also 

Cycling in New South Wales
Cycling in Sydney
Cycling in Australia

References

External links 
 NSW Cycleway Finder (interactive map)
 Bicycle NSW website
 City of Sydney - Cycling
 
 Cycling on Anzac Bridge
 Trailflix guide to Sydney's MTB Trails & off-road Cycleways
The Sydney Cycle Map hosted in Google Maps by BikeTrail.Blog 2019

Cycling in Sydney
Sydney